Nannolytoceras is an extinct genus of lytoceratid ammonite, family Lytoceratidae, with a stratigraphic range extending from the Bajocian age to Bathonian age (Medium Jurassic).

Description
The shell is evolute, smooth, tubular to compressed, with a variable number of more or less regularly spaced deep constrictions. The very thin ribs crossing the ventral region are barely visible. Umbilicus is relatively large. The suture line is of ammonitic type. These cephalopods were fast-moving nektonic carnivores.

Distribution
Fossils of species within this genus have been found in the Jurassic rocks of Italy, Spain, Slovakia, and France.

References

Ammonitida genera
Lytoceratina
Jurassic ammonites
Fossils of Spain
Fossils of Italy